Shahrak-e Gol Beyk (also known as Shahrak-e Gol Beyg) is a village in Dust Mohammad Rural District, in the Central District of Hirmand County, Sistan and Baluchestan Province, Iran. At the 2006 census, its population was 521, in 106 families.

References 

Populated places in Hirmand County